Ciara Elizabeth Smyth is an Irish playwright and director.

Writing
 2015: Pour it out., Smock Alley Theatre
 2016: TRIANGLES, Smock Alley Theatre, Nun's Island Theatre (Galway)  & The International Bar
 2016: All honey, The New Theatre
2017: All honey, Dublin Fringe Festival - Winner Fishamble New Writing Award
2018: All honey, Bewley's Cafe Theatre Powerscourt
2018: We Can't Have Monkeys in the House, The New Theatre
2019: Mouth of the Grand Canal, The National Gallery of Ireland
2019: We Can't Have Monkeys in the House, Peacock Theatre
2019: SAUCE, Dublin Fringe Festival
2020: All honey, Project Arts Centre
2020: Party Party, Dear Ireland, Abbey Theatre
2020: Wild Horses, Tiny Plays 24/7, Fishamble: The New Play Company

References

External links
 

Living people
1987 births
Alumni of Dublin Institute of Technology
20th-century Irish actresses
21st-century Irish dramatists and playwrights
Irish directors
21st-century Irish actresses
Irish film actresses
Irish television actresses
21st-century Irish women writers
21st-century Irish writers
Irish women dramatists and playwrights